Drymonia dodonaea, the marbled brown, is a moth of the family Notodontidae. The species was first described by Michael Denis and Ignaz Schiffermüller in 1775. It is found in Europe and in the area surrounding the Caucasus.

The wingspan is 33–38 mm. Similar to Drymonia ruficornis, but the forewings are generally whiter; the crosslines are less straight, and there is no black crescent above the centre of the wings. The moth flies from May to July depending on the location.
The larva is naked and without any conspicuous outgrowths. It is yellow-green on the dorsum, has a red-edged yellow lateral stripe and it is bluish-green under this stripe.

The larvae feed on various deciduous trees, primarily Quercus but also Fagus and Betula.
The male, but not the female comes to light. Females are rarely found at all, probably because they stay up in the tree crowns. After mating, the female lays 150 – 200 eggs in small groups on the underside of oak leaves, which hatch after eight to ten days. The newly hatched larvae usually live in small groups, older larvae live singly. They eat the leaves from the tip inwards so that only the middle nerve is left. When the larva is fully grown in August – September, it crawls down on the ground, spinning an oval, earthy cocoon and transforming into a pupa which overwinters. Sometimes the pupa can overwinter twice before hatching.

References

External links

Marbled brown on UKMoths
 Taxonomy
Lepidoptera of Belgium 
Lepiforum e.V.
De Vlinderstichting 

Notodontidae
Moths of Europe
Moths of Asia
Moths described in 1775
Taxa named by Michael Denis
Taxa named by Ignaz Schiffermüller